Lukov is a Slavic masculine surname, its feminine counterpart is Lukova. It may refer to:
Hristo Lukov (1887–1943), Bulgarian military official and politician
Ivan Lukov (1871–1926), Bulgarian military official
Leonid Lukov (1909–1963), Russian film director and screenwriter
Mariano Lukov (born 1958), Bulgarian table tennis player
Vladimir Lukov (born 1949), Bulgarian poet

Bulgarian-language surnames